Sentinel Secondary School is a secondary school located in West Vancouver, British Columbia, Canada. It is one of three public secondary schools in the West Vancouver district (SD #45) including West Vancouver Secondary School and Rockridge Secondary School. The school has a grass field, two baseball diamonds, three street hockey courts, and three tennis courts. The main field is used for all sports, such as soccer, football, and rugby.

The school was established for the 1962–63 school year with students who had previously attended Hillside Secondary School. The first classes were held in the old Inglewood School until the new building was completed in 1963. The first grade 12 graduating class was in 1965.

Advanced Placement Program
Sentinel offers Advanced Placement Program (AP) courses which are regarded as more rigorous than the general offerings, teaching material equivalent to university-level study. All of the courses require a strong comprehension of general knowledge and excellent work habits. It requires a powerful intellectual commitment to perseverance and solid, foundational work habits. Pre-AP courses are offered to students wishing to prepare for the full Advanced Placement offerings in their Senior School years. Sentinel offers AP classes in French, psychology, calculus, physics, biology, chemistry, language, literature, fine arts, and many more. Students in both grade 11 and 12 are allowed to register for AP courses.

Although Sentinel provides numerous AP courses, it is noteworthy that there are a lot of restrictions that the school makes implicit and ambiguous; these restrictions can be problematic for some students as they can significantly affect the entire timeline of students' plans for participating AP exams. Firstly, since the students are not capable of registering for the AP exams individually, the students have no choice but to follow the instructions the school gives. For example, students who are taking AP Physics 1 class are not able to write the AP Physics 1 exam as the school requires students to take AP Physics 2 in their second year in order to receive the AP Physics 1 exam; in this case, the students can only take the AP Physics 1 exam at Sentinel in their second year of AP Physics. As a result, there is a chance that the students will not have their AP exam scores even if they have finished related AP courses when they file applications to universities. Similarly, students cannot write the exams at Sentinel for courses that they are not taking at the school. Also, the school hosts some AP classes, while a few of the related exams are not provided at Sentinel. Students who take AP courses at Sentinel are required to write the related AP exams at Sentinel Secondary; otherwise, they will be taken out of their AP class and either not receive credits for that course or receive credits for the equivalent non-AP course. The Capstone program is a university-level AP course offered by Sentinel Secondary for English language and literature. It is a research-based program where students get the opportunity to look into a topic of their choice and create a presentation for the class. By allowing students to pick their own material, students have more freedom and are more invested and interested in their learning. The courses provide guidelines for essay writing and citations that will be needed throughout their university education.

Premier Academies and Pursuit Programme
Sentinel is also home to various West Vancouver Schools Premier Academies which specialize in specific sports or activities including the Premier:

 Animation Academy 
 Ballet Academy 
 Baseball Academy 
 Basketball Academy 
 Dance Academy 
 Engineering Academy 
 Environmental Science Academy 
 Fencing Academy 
 Field Hockey Academy
 Hockey Academy 
 Mechatronics Robotics Academy 
 Outdoor Connections Academy  
 Rugby Academy 
 Soccer Academy 
 Table Tennis Academy 
 Tennis Academy  
 Volleyball Academy

The programs integrate academy training into the course-load, with students spending the last block of everyday in their academy – dedicating 2 out of the 8 blocks to their activity. For example, the hockey academy members: are on ice three times per week, once they are in the classroom (learning theory of the sport/nutrition/other), and once at Twist Conditioning or the North Shore Winter Club.

Additionally, Sentinel offers the Pursuit Programme, formerly known as Super Achievers, which provides similar benefits for students participating in sports or certain activities at a provincial/national level, not listed in the Premier Academies (e.g. acrobatics, ballet, rock climbing). In this program, students have the opportunity to take regular classes in the morning and focus on their area of specialization in the afternoon. This program is unique in the West Vancouver school district, making Sentinel especially appealing for athletes. Students from the other two high schools in the area are given the opportunity to participate in the various sports academies Sentinel provides.

Arts Programmes 

Sentinel has a diverse music programme which differentiates from that of other schools. It has a regular stage/jazz band typically for students grades 10–11, a classical orchestra which encompasses all grades, and a unique Rhythm and Blues band usually reserved for those in grades 11–12 by audition. The latter is a band that plays songs anywhere from 60s and 70s R&B, funk, and even rock. Students learn songs by ear from the original recordings rather than from sheet music. In addition to this, the band plays at various school and external events, as well as their own concert, "Jazz Café", which is in collaboration with the jazz band. A number of videos of the Sentinel Rhythm and Blues Band are currently available on YouTube.

Sentinel's theatre program, Sentinel Stage is recognized as one of the best school theatre programs in the North Shore. While its theatre program continues to top the North Shore, its lack of capable members after the graduation of its 2015 class, has been described by local media as "a disappointment".

French Immersion 
Sentinel also offers French Immersion, with École Pauline Johnson being one of the feeder schools. Sentinel offers bilingual instruction to students enrolled in the French Immersion program. Immersion is for students who have received their primary and intermediate level of instruction in French. As students progress through each year, the percentage of classes in French is reduced: Grades 8 and 9 = 50%, Grade 10 = 38%, Grade 11 = 25%, Grade 12 = 12-14%

Motto

The school motto, Summis Cum Animis, is Latin for "with the greatest possible spirit." It was proposed along with a new silver and blue shield logo, by the late Fred Robinson (died 1999), longtime teacher of English and Latin, in 1988 to replace the original motto "Servo" ("I serve"), in part because, Robinson advised, the verb "servo, servire" has connotations of slavery. At the same time, Robinson proposed replacing the school colours (brown and white) with the current blue and silver.

References

External links 
Sentinel Secondary School Homepage
Sentinel Secondary School's Course Book

High schools in British Columbia
West Vancouver
Educational institutions established in 1962
1962 establishments in British Columbia